Memphis Industries is a British independent record label.

Memphis Industries was established as a record label in 1998 by the brothers Ollie and Matt Jacob with the first release being Blue States' Forever EP. It is perhaps best known for The Go! Team and Field Music. The label also served as British distributor for the Swedish group Dungen.

Roster

 Absentee
 Arthur & Yu
 Barbarossa
 The Black Neon
 Black Moth Super Rainbow
 Blue States
 Bricolage
 Broadway Project
 Colourmusic
 Cymbals Eat Guitars
 Dan Michaelson & The Coastguards
 Dungen
 Dutch Uncles
 Dreamend
 Elephant
 El Perro del Mar
 Field Music
 Fort Lauderdale
 Frankie Rose and the Outs
 The Go! Team
 Haley Bonar
 Hooray For Earth
 J. Xaverre
 Jukeboxer
 Le Loup
 Menace Beach
 Milagres
 Nadine
 NZCA Lines
 Papercuts
 Peter Matthew Bauer
 The Pipettes
 The Phoenix Foundation
 Poliça
 Pure Bathing Culture
 The Ruby Suns
 The Russian Futurists
 School of Language
 The Scantharies
 The Shaky Hands
 Slug
 Supreme Cuts
 The Squire of Somerton
 The Week That Was
 Tokyo Police Club
 Weaves

See also
 List of record labels

References

External links
 Official Website

British independent record labels
Indie rock record labels
Pop record labels